or  is a mountain in Trøndelag county, Norway. The mountain sits along the border of the municipalities of Selbu, Tydal, and Meråker. The  summit is located inside the Skarvan and Roltdalen National Park. The closest Norwegian Trekking Association cabin is Ramsjøhytta, several kilometers to the east of the summit.

Name
The name is probably the finite form of fong which means "pole" (used in roundpole fence). It is common in Norway to compare the form of high and steep mountains with staffs, sticks, and poles.

References

Mountains of Trøndelag
Meråker
Tydal
Selbu